Embodied imagination is a therapeutic and creative form of working with dreams and memories pioneered by Dutch Jungian psychoanalyst Robert Bosnak and based on principles first developed by Swiss psychiatrist Carl Jung, especially in his work on alchemy, and on the work of American archetypal psychologist James Hillman, who focused on soul as a simultaneous multiplicity of autonomous states.

The technique of embodied imagination takes dreaming as the paradigm for all work with images. While dreaming, everyone experiences dreams as embodied events in time and space; that is, the dreamer is convinced that he or she is experiencing a real event in a real environment. Bosnak describes how a dream "instantaneously presents a total world, so real that you are convinced you are awake. You don't just think so, you know it in the same way you now know you are awake reading this book."  So from the perspective of dreaming, the image is a place.  Based on this notion, the dreamer can re-enter the landscape of the dream and flash back into its images to more fully and deeply explore and experience them. The dreamer explores the images of the dream while in a hypnagogic state, a state of consciousness between waking and sleeping. While in this state, the dreamer is asked a series of questions that help him or her to re-experience the dream by describing details of its landscape and image. 

Once fully immersed in the images that the dream environment presents, the dreamer is then also invited to feel and identify the feelings and sensations manifested in the body from a variety of dream perspectives. Perspectives explored are both that of the dream ego as well any "others" that appear in the dream. These "others" may be, for example, another person, an animal, or a physical object. Approaching dream figures in this way is consistent with archetypal psychologist James Hillman's prescription for therapeutic work in regard to the phenomena of psychic multiplicity. Drawing upon Carl Jung's realization that "the ego complex is not the only complex in the psyche," Hillman described the psyche to be not a singular unified whole defined by the ego point of view, but rather a self-organizing multiplicity of autonomous selves. In the technique of embodied imagination, for each of these "selves" or "states" representing various perspectives, the dreamer then feels, identifies, and locates the feelings and sensations in his or her body. At the conclusion of the dreamwork session, the dreamer simultaneously holds in conscious awareness these differentiated and complex states of embodied feeling and sensation. The act of holding these multiple disparate states at the same time creates a psychical tension from which a completely new image or feeling state spontaneously emerges from the dreamer's psyche. This new image or state presents a completely new and previously unknown awareness to the dreamer, one through which the dreamer often feels changed, transformed, or greatly expanded in the ability to embody and feel intensely. 

After working with a dream in this way, one dreamer, a woman whose name is Ariel, later reflected, "That dreamwork warded off my seasonal depression which always starts in the autumn. I could already feel it creeping up at the time of the dream. And with the dreamwork it just stopped and retreated and never came back. I didn't have it all winter."  Ariel's transformation is typical of those who practice this method of working with dreams. Using the technique of embodied imagination in dreamwork, the body becomes the theater for a vivid complexity of states, which leads along "alchemical" lines to profound psychical transformation.

Practice

Working with both dreams and memories, embodied imagination is practiced individually and in groups in psychotherapy, medicine, theater, art and creative research. The technique has been used as a rehearsal method by the Royal Shakespeare Company in Stratford-upon-Avon and the Bell Shakespeare Company in Sydney. Both its simple rules and emphasis on group participation augment working on the Internet, where this technique is practiced in small dream groups using on-line voice chat forums such as Paltalk. A simplified form of Embodied Imagination for creativity is called DreamPlay

Professional societies
On November 3, 2006, the International Society for Embodied Imagination was founded at a conference in Guangzhou, China.

See also
Alchemy
Archetypal psychology
Carl Jung
Contemporary dream interpretation
James Hillman
Polytheistic myth as psychology

References

Notes

Further reading
Bosnak, Robert. (October 2003). Embodied imagination, Journal of Contemporary Psychoanalysis, Volume 39, Number 4.
Bosnak, Robert. (2007). Embodiment: Creative imagination in medicine, art and travel. London: Routledge.
Bosnak, Robert. (Spring 2006). Sulphur dreaming. Spring: A Journal of Archetype and Culture, Volume 74, pp. 91–106.
Bromberg, Philip M. (October 2003). On being one's dream: Some reflections on Robert Bosnak's "Embodied imagination." Journal of Contemporary Psychoanalysis, Volume 39, Number 4.
Corbin, Henry. (1972). Mundus imaginalis, or the Imaginary and the Imaginal (Ruth Horine, Trans.). Spring: An Annual of Archetypal Psychology and Jungian Thought, pp. 1–19.
Hillman, James. (1975). Re-visioning psychology. New York: Harper and Row.
Schwartz-Salant, Nathan, Ed. (1995). Jung on alchemy, Princeton, NJ: Princeton University Press.
Sonenberg, Janet. (2003). Dreamwork for actors. London/New York: Routledge.
•White, Judy and Jill Fischer. Embodied Imagination® in Barrett, Diedre and McNamara, Patrick, editors. Encyclopedia of Sleep and Dreams [2 volumes]: The Evolution, Function, Nature, and Mysteries of Slumber, Greenwood, 2012.

External links
Cyberdreamwork Using the latest technologies with proven dreamwork practices, this site offers global, real-time, interactive dreamwork experience over the Internet.
Embodied imagination in the work with dreams and memories Page has links to lectures by Robert Bosnak.
The International Association for the Study of Dreams Supports and discusses research in dreams and dreaming.
Pacifica Graduate Institute Graduate school offering programs in Jungian and post-Jungian studies.
 

Dream
Personal life
Psychotherapies
Acting techniques
Analytical psychology